A reading of a bill is a stage of debate on the bill held by a general body of a legislature. 

In the Westminster system, developed in the United Kingdom, there are generally three readings of a bill as it passes through the stages of becoming, or failing to become, legislation. Some of these readings may be formalities rather than actual debate.

The procedure dates back to the centuries before literacy was widespread. Since many members of Parliament were illiterate, the Clerk of Parliament would read aloud a bill to inform members of its contents. By the end of the 16th century, it was practice to have the bill read on three occasions before it was passed.

Preliminary reading
In the Israeli Knesset, private member bills do not enter the house at first reading. Instead, they are subject to a preliminary reading, where the members introducing the bill present it to the Knesset, followed by a debate on the general outlines of the bill followed by a vote on whether to send it to committee to be prepared for first reading or to remove it from the agenda.

First reading
A first reading is when a bill is introduced to a legislature. 

Typically, in the United States, the title of the bill is read and the bill is immediately assigned to a committee. The bill is then considered by committee between the first and second readings. In the United States Senate and most British-influenced legislatures, the committee consideration occurs between second and third readings.

In most non Westminster-style legislatures, a vote is taken on the general outlines of the bill before being sent to committee.

Australia
In the Australian House of Representatives, a bill is automatically read a first time without any question being proposed upon presentation of the bill or it being received from the Senate.

However, in the Australian Senate, the question on the first reading is always moved immediately after introduction (which is a separate motion altogether) or receipt from the House of Representatives and may be voted on. Amendments to or debate on the first reading is not permitted, except for bills subject to section 53 of the Constitution (i.e. appropriation and money bills), in which case debate is permitted. The first readings of most ordinary bills are almost always a formality and are passed "on the voices". In extremely rare circumstances however, the Senate may vote against the first reading, which prevents the bill from proceeding further. This has happened as recently as June 2021, when the Ministerial Suitability Commission of Inquiry Bill 2021 (Cth), introduced by Greens Senator Larissa Waters in relation to the 1988 rape allegation against the Attorney-General Christian Porter, was narrowly negatived in a division.

Similar arrangements are in place in the parliaments of the states and territories.

Canada
In the House of Commons of Canada, in addition to the usual introduction of a bill by a member for first reading, a member of the cabinet may move a motion to appoint or to instruct a committee to prepare a bill.

Republic of Ireland
In the Oireachtas of Ireland, the first stage of a bill is by either of two methods:
 introduction by a private member moving a motion "that leave be given to introduce" the bill—the bill goes to second stage if the motion is carried
 presentation on behalf of either the government (unlimited numbers) or a parliamentary group (one at a time per group in the Dáil, three in the Seanad)—the bill automatically goes to second stage

Israel
In the Israeli Knesset, the committee consideration occurs between first and second readings and (for private member bills) between preliminary and first readings, and the first reading includes a debate on the general outlines of the bill followed by a vote on whether or not to send it to committee.

Poland
In the Polish Sejm, the first reading comprises a debate on the general outlines of the bill. Notably, only constitutional amendment bills, money bills, electoral law bills, and law code bills have their first reading at a plenary session of the Sejm; all other bills have their first reading occur in committee, unless the Marshal of the Sejm decides to refer them to the plenum.

Russia
In the Russian State Duma, the first reading includes a debate on the general outlines of the bill followed by a vote on whether or not to send it to committee.

New Zealand
In New Zealand, once a bill passes first reading it is normally referred to a select committee. However, the government can have a bill skip the select committee stage by a simple majority vote in Parliament.

Even if the first reading does not require a formal vote, a bill can nonetheless be defeated on first reading if a member introduces it and no one seconds it.

Second reading 

A second reading is the stage of the legislative process where a draft of a bill is read a second time. 

In most Westminster-style legislatures, a vote is taken on the general outlines of the bill before being sent to committee. In most non-Westminster-style legislatures, the bill's detailed provisions are considered in the second reading, and then voted on clause by clause.

Republic of Ireland
In the Oireachtas, the second reading is referred to as "second stage", though the subheading "second reading" is used in Dáil standing orders, and the motion at second stage is still "that the Bill is to be read a second time". A bill introduced in one house enters the other house at second stage, except that the Seanad second stage is waived for Dáil consolidation bills. Once the bill passes second stage it is referred to a select committee of that house or taken in committee stage by the whole house.

Israel
In the Knesset, the bill's detailed provisions are considered in the second reading, and then voted on clause by clause. However, continuous stretches of clauses without any proposed amendments (which includes different wordings for the same clause written in the original bill), are voted as a single bloc. The starting point for the bill considered in second reading is its post-committee consideration text, which can vary widely from the bill voted on in first reading, even to the point of mergers and splits.

Poland
In the Polish Sejm, the second reading comprises a consideration of the committee's report on the bill (as committee consideration between first and second readings), and an introduction of any proposed amendments, although the Sejm's standing orders do not provide for a clause by clause vote on the bill itself, or on any amendment, during the second reading. If amendments are introduced to a bill, it is returned for further committee consideration between second and third readings unless the Sejm decides otherwise.

Russia
In the Russian State Duma, the bill's detailed provisions are considered in the second reading, and then voted on clause by clause.

United States
In the United States Senate, a bill is either referred to committee or placed on the Calendar of Business after second reading. No vote is held on whether to read the bill a second time. In U.S. legislatures where consideration in committee precedes second reading, the procedure varies as to how a bill reaches second reading. In Illinois, for example, legislation is automatically read a second time, after which amendments are in order.

New Zealand
In New Zealand, once a bill passes a second reading it is then considered clause-by-clause by the whole Parliament. If a majority of Parliament agree, the bill can be considered part-by-part, saving considerable time.  Because most bills must have majority support to pass a second reading, it is now very rare for a bill to be considered clause-by-clause.

Third reading

A third reading is the stage of a legislative process in which a bill is read with all amendments and given final approval by a legislative body.

In legislatures whose procedures are based on those of the Westminster system, the third reading occurs after the bill has been amended by committee and considered for amendment at report stage (or, in Israel's case, second reading).

In most bicameral legislatures, a bill must separately pass the third reading in both chambers. Once that happens, it is sent on for promulgation, such as royal assent in the Westminster system or signing by the president or governor in the U.S. model.

In some bicameral legislatures, such as the Parliament of Poland or of the Czech Republic, a bill must pass three readings in the lower house, but only one reading in the upper house, at which the bill may be passed unchanged, amended, or rejected; and if the bill is not passed unchanged by the upper house, it is returned to the lower house, which may impose its original version by a supermajority, and is sent to promulgation after passing both chambers. This "imperfect" procedure requires that all bills must be introduced to the lower house, although this may be mitigated by giving the upper house the right to submit bills to the lower.

In a unicameral legislature, after passing the third reading in the sole chamber, the bill goes on directly for promulgation.

Republic of Ireland
In the Oireachtas of Ireland, the equivalent of the third reading is referred to as the "fifth stage" or "final stage". The motion is "That the Bill do now pass", except that the Seanad motion for a money bill is "That the Bill be returned to the Dáil". When a bill passes one house, it is sent to the other house and enters at second stage. After both houses have passed the bill, it is sent to the President of Ireland to be signed into law.

Poland
In the Polish Sejm, the third reading comprises a presentation of the amendments passed in second reading (or of a second committee report on the bill that was returned to committee after second reading), and a voting sequence: first on a motion to reject the bill (if one is introduced), then on the amendments introduced in second reading, and a final vote on the bill as amended.

See also

Bill (law)
Parliamentary procedure
Separation of powers

References

Bibliography

 Australian Senate, 'Consideration of legislation', Brief Guides to Senate Procedure, No. 9, Department of the Senate, Canberra.
 
 
 

Statutory law